Tamburo  is an Indian Gujarati comedy film directed by Shailesh Shankar. It stars Bollywood veteran actor Manoj Joshi, and Pratik Gandhi, with Bharat Chawda.

Plot 
The plot revolves around three P’s – Paisa, Property &  Pyaar. Hardik and Bhavik, friends for life are ambitious young men who dream of becoming wealthy quickly and effortlessly.  In their quest for easy money, a twist of fate ensures that the duo find themselves embroiled in a situation that sets a chain reaction where the Mafia, the Police and the Gamblers are all on a hilarious chase after them.

Cast
Manoj Joshi as Kirit Bhai
Bharat Chawda as Hardik
 Pratik Gandhi as Bhavik  
 Ojas Rawal as Sultan   
 Jayesh More as Sanjay Hegde       
 Hemang Dave as Kalpesh              
 Prasad Barve as Chirag                     
 Ayush Jadeja as Manya                    
 Janki Bodiwala as Dimple
 Priiya Nair as Nidhi

Track listing
The Soundtrack was released by Red Ribbon Entertainment.

Release
The film was released in Gujarat and Maharashtra on 18 August 2017.

References

External links
 IMDB

2017 films
Films shot in India
Films shot in Gujarat
2010s Gujarati-language films